Samuel Hood may refer to:
 Samuel Hood, 1st Viscount Hood (1724–1816), British admiral
 Sir Samuel Hood, 1st Baronet (1762–1814), British admiral
 Samuel Hood, 2nd Baron Bridport (1788–1868)
 Samuel Hood (priest) (1782–1872), Anglican priest
 Samuel Hood, 6th Viscount Hood (1910–1981), Foreign Office official and diplomat
 Sam Hood (1872–1953), Australian photographer